Patrick Rafter defeated Richard Krajicek in the final, 7–6,(7–3), 6–4 to win the men's singles tennis title at the 1998 Canadian Open.

Chris Woodruff was the reigning champion, but did not participate this year.

Seeds 
A champion seed is indicated in bold text while text in italics indicates the round in which that seed was eliminated.  The top eight seeds received a bye to the second round.

  Pete Sampras (quarterfinals)
  Petr Korda (second round)
  Patrick Rafter (champion)
  Yevgeny Kafelnikov (quarterfinals)
  Jonas Björkman (quarterfinals)
  Richard Krajicek (final)
  Tim Henman (semifinals)
  Andre Agassi (semifinals)
  Álbert Costa (third round)
  Goran Ivanišević (third round)
  Thomas Enqvist (withdrew)
  Gustavo Kuerten (first round)
  Jan Siemerink (first round)
  Mark Philippoussis (third round)
  Fabrice Santoro (second round)
  Wayne Ferreira (first round)
  Nicolas Kiefer (third round)

Draw

Finals

Top half

Section 1

Section 2

Bottom half

Section 3

Section 4

External links
 1998 du Maurier Open draw

Men's Singles